Alfonso Ottaviani (5 October 1937 – 3 March 2008) was an Italian modern pentathlete. He competed at the 1964 Summer Olympics.

References

External links
 

1937 births
2008 deaths
Italian male modern pentathletes
Olympic modern pentathletes of Italy
Modern pentathletes at the 1964 Summer Olympics
People from Terni
Sportspeople from the Province of Terni
20th-century Italian people